John Chilton Burch (February 1, 1826 – August 31, 1885) was an American lawyer from California. He became a Democratic politician who served one term as a  United States Congressman from 1859 to 1861.

Biography 
Burch was born in Boone County, Missouri. He attended the Bonne Femme Academy and Kemper College, and then studied law in Jefferson City, Missouri. Burch was admitted to the bar, practiced law, then became deputy clerk of Cole County, Missouri, and Assistant Adjutant General of Missouri.

Political career 
Burch moved to California in 1850 during the California Gold Rush and worked in the mines until 1851. He was elected clerk of the newly organized Trinity County, and was appointed district attorney in 1853.

Burch was elected to the California State Assembly in 1856 and then served in the California State Senate until 1859.

He was elected as a Democrat to the 36th Congress (1859–61).

Later career 
After serving one term, he resumed the practice of law in San Francisco. He was appointed a code commissioner and served four years, but declined to be a candidate for Judge of the Supreme Court of California.

Death
Burch died 1885 in San Francisco and is interred in the Sacramento Historic City Cemetery in Sacramento, California.

References

1826 births
1885 deaths
Democratic Party members of the United States House of Representatives from California
Democratic Party California state senators
Democratic Party members of the California State Assembly
People from Trinity County, California
Secretaries of the United States Senate
19th-century American politicians